Yuliy Abramovich Ganf (8 June 1898 – 21 May 1973) was a Soviet Russian graphic artist, a People's Artist of the USSR, especially known for his satirical cartoons in the Krokodil magazine. He was furthermore active as a caricaturist, illustrator and poster designer.

Life and career

Yuliy Ganf was born in the city of Poltava (present-day Ukraine). He studied in the Art Shop of Eduard Steinberg in 1917–1920 and in VKhUTEMAS (The Higher Artistic and Technical Shops) in 1922–1924. In 1920s, he produced political caricatures for Moscow-based magazines and newspapers: Krasny Perets, Bezbozhnik, Krokodil, Pravda, illustrated books published for Detgiz (The State Publishing House of Children's Literature of the Ministry of Education of RSFSR). He was the author of many political slogans in 1930s. 

In 1945, he was granted the title of Honoured Artist of RSFSR, and in 1964 was named a People's Artist of the USSR. In 1970, he was awarded the golden Fighter for Peace medal at the International Exhibition "Satire in Fight for Peace". Yuliy Ganf died in Moscow.

The artworks of Ganf are exhibited in several museums of art throughout Russia and CIS: Tver Museum of Art, Yekaterinburg Museum of Art, Lugansk Museum of Art, Yerevan Armenia Art Gallery, the Russian State Library and other collections.

Sources

1898 births
1973 deaths
Vkhutemas alumni
National University of Kharkiv alumni
Russian caricaturists
Russian cartoonists
Russian editorial cartoonists
Russian graphic designers
Russian illustrators
Russian poster artists
Russian satirists
Ukrainian graphic designers
Ukrainian caricaturists
Ukrainian cartoonists
Ukrainian editorial cartoonists
Ukrainian illustrators
Ukrainian poster artists
Ukrainian satirists
People's Artists of the USSR (visual arts)
Artists from Poltava